Long Beach Lesbian & Gay Pride is held yearly on the next to last weekend in May in Long Beach, California. Long Beach Pride held its first event in 1984 and has since grown to be the second largest gay pride event in the United States. The Pride Celebration is Produced by the non-profit organization called the LBLGP Inc. (Long Beach Lesbian and Gay Pride Inc.) They operate all year long and donate money to many charitable and other non-profit organizations.

About LBLGP Inc. 
Long Beach Lesbian & Gay Pride, Inc. (LBLGP, Inc.) was established in October 1983 and produced the first annual Long Beach Lesbian & Gay Pride Festival & Parade in June 1984. The Board of Directors felt that, with such a large Gay & Lesbian population, there was a need to increase awareness and to promote PRIDE and a greater sense of self-worth within the Community. Additionally, the Board felt it important to facilitate greater cooperation, mutual respect and understanding between the Lesbian & Gay Community and the community of Long Beach.

At first, money to meet the city's stringent fees was in short supply. Yet, after producing only two parades and festivals, LBLGP, Inc. began making outright grants to other nonprofit organizations. Shortly after that, LBLGP, Inc. began donating funds to their volunteer's favorite charities. The amount of this contribution is based on the number of hours volunteers work at the parade and festival. Today, LBLGP, Inc. continues the tradition of giving back a portion of the proceeds, which has become the hallmark of our organization. For over more than a decade now, LBLGP, Inc. has grown to become the large philanthropic organization that it is today--- having granted over a Half Million dollars in the past five years and nearly One Million since its inception.

While the main project of Long Beach Lesbian & Gay Pride, Inc. is the annual Pride Parade & Festival, the organization operates year-round and sponsors other philanthropic projects. Since the beginning, LBLGP, Inc. has spearheaded a toy drive for disabled and disadvantaged children. In 1994 alone, the toy drive collected over 1500 toys distributed in cooperation with Catholic Charities. Over the past several years, the Long Beach Lesbian & Gay Pride Festival & Parade has become the 3rd largest in the nation, now attracting over 75,000 participants over the two-day celebration. More than 200 marching groups and floats comprise the parade entries since 1995, representing various religious, human services, governmental and social organizations.

There was no parade since 2020, but a virtual festival did take place.

Notable Performers
Amber
Azealia Banks
The Bangles
Sara Bareilles
Black Box
Christian Chávez
The Cover Girls
Deborah Cox
Elvis Crespo
Kat DeLuna
Aarón Díaz
Ari Gold
Jennifer Holliday
Jennifer Hudson
Allison Iraheta
Ivy Queen
Evelyn 'Champagne' King
La India
Queen Latifah
Alec Mapa
Edith Marquez
Lucía Méndez
Monica
Amanda Perez
Shannon
Smash Mouth
Jazmine Sullivan
Olga Tañón
Jeanie Tracy
Gloria Trevi
The Village People
Shangela Laquifa Wadley
Kim Yarbrough

External links
 Official web site

Culture of Long Beach, California
Pride parades in California
Annual events in Los Angeles County, California